Sante Scarcia (12 June 1903 – 14 May 1994) was an Italian weightlifter. He competed in the men's featherweight event at the 1924 Summer Olympics.

References

External links
 

1903 births
1994 deaths
Italian male weightlifters
Olympic weightlifters of Italy
Weightlifters at the 1924 Summer Olympics
Sportspeople from Bari
20th-century Italian people